Archery at the 26th Southeast Asian Games was held at Senayan ABC Football Field, Jakarta, Indonesia.

Medal summary

Recurve

Compound

Medal table

2011 Southeast Asian Games events
Archery at the Southeast Asian Games
2011 in archery
Archery in Indonesia